A Pale Debilitating Autumn is the 1994 debut album by German technical death metal band Pavor.

Track listing
All songs written & arranged by Pavor.
"A Pale Debilitating Autumn" – 6:53 
"Total Warrior" – 5:34  
"Corpses" – 5:30  
"Careworn" – 4:20  
"Pavor" – 4:50  
"Imperator Of An Ashen Bane" – 8:16  
"Fucked By Darkness" – 4:24  
"Symbols Of Depravity" – 6:35

References

Pavor albums
1994 albums